Róż is a river of Poland, a tributary of the Narew near Młynarze.

Rivers of Poland
Rivers of Masovian Voivodeship